Richard Fitzgibbon is the name of:

 Richard FitzGibbon, 3rd Earl of Clare (1793–1864), Irish politician and noble
 Richard B. Fitzgibbon Jr. (1920–1956), American soldier